Nguveren Iyorhe (born 9 June 1981) is a Nigerian basketball player who competed in the 2004 Summer Olympics.

References

External links
 

1981 births
Living people
Nigerian women's basketball players
Olympic basketball players of Nigeria
Basketball players at the 2004 Summer Olympics
Place of birth missing (living people)
21st-century Nigerian women